Nicolas Rossolimo (February 28, 1910 – July 24, 1975) was a Russian Empire-born chess player. After acquiring Greek citizenship in 1929, he was able to emigrate that year to France, and was many times chess champion of Paris. In 1952 he emigrated to the United States, and won the 1955 U.S. Open Chess Championship. He was awarded the title of International Grandmaster by FIDE in 1953. Rossolimo was a resident of New York City until his death.

The Rossolimo Variation of the Sicilian Defence bears his name.

Biography and chess career
Nikolai Spiridonovich Rossolimo was born into an upper-middle-class Russian-Greek family in Kiev, then part of the Russian Empire. His father was Spiridon Rossolimo, a Russian painter and portraitist of Greek ancestry, while his mother née Xenia Nikolaevna Skugarevskaya was an aristocratic writer and war correspondent. He was a nephew of the famous Russian neurologist and psychiatrist Grigory Ivanovich Rossolimo. He lived in Moscow during the mid-1920s, and moved to Paris with his Russian mother in 1929.

Having finished second behind former World Champion José Raúl Capablanca in a tournament in Paris in 1938, he won the French Championship in 1948. He was Paris champion a record seven times, and drew two matches in 1948 and 1949 with Savielly Tartakower. In 1955, he won the U.S. Open Championship held in Long Beach, California, on tiebreaks ahead of Samuel Reshevsky. The prize was a new Buick automobile.

Rossolimo played for France in the Chess Olympiads of 1950 and 1972, and for the United States in 1958, 1960, and 1966. FIDE awarded him the International Master title in 1950 and the International Grandmaster title in 1953.

In 1952, he moved to the U.S. with his wife Véra and son Alexander to rejoin his mother and Russian-Greek father in New York. (After moving to the U.S., his first name was often spelled "Nicholas".) In New York, he worked as a waiter, a taxi driver, played the accordion, and worked as a singer and ran a chess studio as well to support himself and his family. The Rossolimo Chess Studio was located in Greenwich Village in Manhattan. It was somewhat like a café that served food and drinks, and also sold chess sets and books, but where members of the public – including famous artists such as Marcel Duchamp – could come and play chess with each other and occasionally play Rossolimo himself for a fee (Rossolimo would play simultaneous chess with many of the patrons).

Rossolimo died of head injuries following a fall down a flight of stairs, just after finishing third in his final event, the 1975 World Open. He was buried in a Russian Orthodox cemetery in New Jersey.

Chess talent

The strongest players Rossolimo defeated were Efim Bogoljubov, David Bronstein, and former World Champion Max Euwe, against whom he had two wins and a lifetime plus score. He also scored draws against four world champions: José Capablanca, Max Euwe, Bobby Fischer, and Vassily Smyslov. According to the site Chessmetrics, which estimates historical ratings of players based on results, his highest ranking was 15th in the world, reached in December 1953.

Rossolimo won many brilliancy and "best-game" prizes for his beautiful chess games, and has been called an "artist of chess". He has been quoted to have said (here in translation): "What am I supposed to do, trade in my romantic style and become a hunter of points at any price? No, I will not do so. I will fight for the art of chess. I shall not turn into a monster".

Here is one of Rossolimo's most celebrated brilliancies. Al Horowitz, the late chess columnist for The New York Times, called this game "a brilliancy of astonishing character, elegant and explosive".

Rossolimo vs. Paul Reissman, San Juan 1967 1.e4 e5 2.Nf3 Nc6 3.Bc4 Bc5 4.c3 Nf6 5.d4 exd4 6.cxd4 Bb4+ 7.Bd2 Bxd2+ 8.Nbxd2 d5 9.exd5 Nxd5 10.Qb3 Nce7 11.0-0 c6 12.Rfe1 0-0 13.a4 b6 14.Ne5 Bb7 15.a5 Rc8 16.Ne4 Qc7 17.a6 Ba8 18.Qh3 Nf4 19.Qg4 Ned5 20.Ra3 Ne6 21.Bxd5 cxd5 22.Nf6+ Kh8 (diagram) 23.Qg6 Qc2 24.Rh3! 

The Boston Globe wrote: "The truly talented Nicolas Rossolimo played one of the most amazing moves ever in Rossolimo–Reissman: 23.Qg6!!".

Legacy

One of Rossolimo's more enduring innovations is the variation of the Sicilian Defence which bears his name – the Rossolimo Variation: 1.e4 c5 2.Nf3 Nc6 3.Bb5 (see diagram). While generally steering clear of the tactical fireworks common to open Sicilians, the Rossolimo Variation offers White some chance of an opening advantage.

Other
Rossolimo wrote two books: Les Echecs au coin du feu, a collection of his studies and endgames with a preface by Savielly Tartakower, published in Paris in 1947; and Rossolimo's Brilliancy Prizes, self-published in New York in 1970. He also made a record of songs in Russian, French, and English, with an album cover designed by Marcel Duchamp and produced by the Kismet Record Company. He is the hero of a chapter in the book, Losing Moses on the Freeway. He also held a brown belt in judo and recorded an album of Russian songs.

Tournaments and matches
The following table gives Rossolimo's placings and scores in a number of major tournaments and matches. (The "Score" column gives the number of points / the total possible. The "+" indicates the number of won games, "−" the number of losses, and "=" the number of draws.)

{| class="wikitable sortable" style="text-align:center"
! Year !! City !! Tournament !! +W−L=D !! Score !! Place
|-
|1931 ||align="left"|Paris ||align="left"|Paris championship || +11−3=2 || 12/16 ||3-4
|-
|1934 ||align="left"|Paris ||align="left"|Paris championship || +12−0=2 || 13/14 ||1
|-
|1937 ||align="left"|Paris ||align="left"|Paris International Exposition || || ||1 
|-
|1938 ||align="left"|Paris ||align="left"|International tournament||+6−1=3|| 7½/10  ||2
|-
|1939 ||align="left"|Paris ||align="left"|International tournament||+9−0=5|| 11½/14  ||1
|-
|1947 ||align="left"|Hilversum ||align="left"| European Zonal tournament || +5−5=3 ||6½/13 ||7–8
|-
|1948 ||align="left"|Paris ||align="left"|French championship|| +5−0=3 || 6½/8  ||1
|-
|1948 ||align="left"|Beverwijk ||align="left"|Corus chess tournament || +3-2=4 || 5/9 ||3–4
|-
|1948 ||align="left"|Bad Gastein ||align="left"|International tournament|| +12−2=5 ||14½/19 ||2–3
|-
|1948 || align="left"|Paris ||align="left"|Match with Savielly Tartakower || +1−1=10 ||6/12 ||tie
|-
|1948/49 ||align="left"|Hastings ||align="left"| Hastings International Chess Congress || +4−0=5 ||6½/9 ||1
|-
|1949 ||align="left"|Southsea ||align="left"|International tournament|| +8−0=2 || 9/10||1
|-
|1949 ||align="left"|Heidelberg ||align="left"|International tournament|| +4−1=4 || 6/9 ||2
|-
|1949 ||align="left"|Trenčianske Teplice ||align="left"|International tournament|| +9−4=6 ||12/19 ||4–5 
|-
|1949 ||align="left"|Gijón ||align="left"|International tournament|| +9−0=2 || 10/11 ||1
|-
|1949 ||align="left"|Venice ||align="left"|International tournament|| +8−2=5 ||10½/15 ||2
|-
|1949 ||align="left"|Paris ||align="left"| Match with Savielly Tartakower || +5−5=0 || 5/10 || tie
|-
|1949/50 ||align="left"|Hastings ||align="left"| Hastings International Chess Congress || +6−0=3 ||7½/9 ||2
|-
|1950 ||align="left"|Beverwijk ||align="left"|Corus chess tournament || +4−1=4 || 6/9 || 2–3
|-
|1950 ||align="left"|Gijón ||align="left"|International tournament|| +7−1=3 || 8½/11 || 1
|-
|1950 ||align="left"|Venice ||align="left"|International tournament|| +7−2=6 || 10/15 ||3
|-
|1950 ||align="left"|Amsterdam ||align="left"|International tournament|| +5−2=12 || 11/19 || 8
|-
|1950 ||align="left"|Mar del Plata ||align="left"| Mar del Plata chess tournament|| +5−3=9 || 9½/17 ||8
|-
|1950 ||align="left"|Dubrovnik ||align="left"|9th Chess Olympiad|| +7−1=4 || 9/12 ||2
|-
|1950/51 ||align="left"|Hastings ||align="left"| Hastings International Chess Congress || +5−1=3 || 6½/9 ||2–3
|-
|1951 ||align="left"|Reykjavík ||align="left"|International tournament|| +6−0=3|| 7½/9 ||1
|-
|1951 ||align="left"|Southsea ||align="left"|International tournament|| +6−0=4 || 8/12 ||1–2
|-
|1951 ||align="left"|Bilbao ||align="left"|International tournament|| +9−0=0|| 9/9 ||1
|- 
|1951 ||align="left"|A Coruña ||align="left"|International tournament|| ||6½/8  ||1
|- 
|1951 ||align="left"|Vitoria ||align="left"|International tournament|| +6−0=1|| 6½/7  ||1
|- 
|1951 ||align="left"|Birmingham ||align="left"|Howard Staunton Memorial Tournament || +4−2=9 || 8½/15 ||5–8
|-
|1952 ||align="left"|Havana ||align="left"|International tournament|| +9−4=7 || 12½/20 ||6
|-
|1952 ||align="left"|Saarland ||align="left"| International tournament|| || ||1
|-
|1952 ||align="left"|New York City ||align="left"|Match with Arthur Bisguier || +1−0=1 || 1½–½ ||won
|-
|1953 ||align="left"|Milwaukee ||align="left"|U.S. Open Chess Championship || ||  ||3–8
|-
|1953 ||align="left"|Beverwijk ||align="left"|Corus chess tournament || +7−0=4 || 9/11 ||1
|-
|1954 ||align="left"|Hollywood ||align="left"|Pan American Chess Championship || || ||3–4
|-
|1954 ||align="left"|New York City ||align="left"|U.S. Chess Championship || +3−2=8 ||7/13 ||6-7
|-
|1955 ||align="left"|Long Beach ||align="left"|U.S. Open Chess Championship || ||10/12  ||1
|-
|1956 ||align="left"|Washington, D.C. ||align="left"|Eastern States Open Championship|| +4−0=3 || 5½/7 ||2-5
|-
|1957 ||align="left"|Tarragona ||align="left"|International Tournament|| +6−1=2 || 7/9  ||2
|-
|1958 ||align="left"|Munich ||align="left"|13th Chess Olympiad || +6−1=8 || 10/15 ||3
|-
|1960 ||align="left"|Leipzig ||align="left"|14th Chess Olympiad || +2−1=3 || 3½/6 ||
|-
|1965 ||align="left"|New York City ||align="left"|U.S. Chess Championship || || 6/11 ||6
|-
|1966 ||align="left"|Havana ||align="left"|17th Chess Olympiad|| +5−1=4 || 7/10 ||
|-
|1967 ||align="left"|Washington, D.C. ||align="left"|Eastern Open Chess Championship|| +7−0=2 || 8/9 ||1
|-
|1967 ||align="left"|Puerto Rico ||align="left"|Puerto Rico Open|| +5−0=2 || 6/7  ||1
|-
|1968 ||align="left"|Málaga ||align="left"|International tournament|| ||5½/11||6–9
|-
|1969 ||align="left"|Monte Carlo ||align="left"|All-grandmaster tournament|| ||5½/11 ||7
|-
|1969 ||align="left"|Vršac ||align="left"|International tournament|| || 8½/15  ||6–8
|-
|1972 ||align="left"|Skopje ||align="left"|20th Chess Olympiad || +7−6=4 || 9/17 ||
|-
|1975 ||align="left"|New York City ||align="left"|World Open chess tournament|| +7−1=1 || 7½/9 ||3
|}

References

External links
 The Rossolimo Sicilian a three-part article
 

1910 births
1975 deaths
American chess players
French chess players
Greek chess players
Russian chess players
Ukrainian chess players
Chess grandmasters
Chess Olympiad competitors
Chess theoreticians
Sportspeople from Paris
Sportspeople from Kyiv
Russian people of Greek descent
Soviet emigrants to France
Soviet emigrants to the United States
French emigrants to the United States
20th-century chess players